Sangar (also known as Sangī Sar and Shahr-e Sangar) is a city and capital of Sangar District, in Rasht County, Gilan Province, Iran.  At the 2006 census, its population was 6,388, in 1,834 families.

References

Populated places in Rasht County

Cities in Gilan Province